The Vietnam War Song Project (VWSP) is an archive and interpretive examination of over 6000 Vietnam War songs identified. It was founded in 2007 by its current editor, Justin Brummer, a historian with a PhD in contemporary Anglo-American relations from University College London. The project analyses the lyrics, and collects data on the genre, location, ethnicity, nationality, language, and time period of the recordings. It also involves the preservation of the original physical vinyl records. Additional items collected include cassette tapes, CDs, MP3s, record label scans, and sheet music.

The project is currently hosted on the online collaborative database Rate Your Music, with components on YouTube, Twitter, and at the University of Maryland.

Part of the project includes a discography, Vietnam War Songs: An incomplete discography, which has over 6000 titles, both unique songs and cover songs, a collaboration between Hugo Keesing, Wouter Keesing, C.L. Yarbrough, and Justin Brummer at the University of Maryland Libraries. Hugo Keesing, adjunct professor of American Studies at the University of Maryland, and the producer of the 13 CD box-set compilation Next Stop Is Vietnam is also a major contributor of songs and record scans.

The project has categorised songs into a variety of themes, from anti-war / protest / peace songs, to patriotic / pro-government / anti-protest songs during the war years, as well an analysis of songs released in the post-war period. Other themes include regional songs, such as Puerto Ricans in the Vietnam War, Australia in the Vietnam War, New Zealand in the Vietnam War, Mexican-Americans, and songs from South America, Central America, and the Caribbean. Genres include soul, gospel & funk, the blues, garage rock, and punk music. The project also looks at songs about key events and issues, which include the Chicago Seven, Kent State shootings, the My Lai Massacre, and the Vietnam War POW/MIA issue. Other topics include songs about the Vietnam Veterans Memorial, Christmas music referencing the Vietnam War, and Vietnam War songs referencing the Civil rights movement in the US (1950s-60s), the Silent majority, and the Domino theory.

The project is a respected academic resource and a significant source of reference in popular culture. Erin R. McCoy, Associate Professor of English at the University of South Carolina Beaufort, notes in her book A War Tour of Viet Nam: A Cultural History, that "Brummer...is tirelessly cataloging every obscure piece of music from the Viet Nam era or about the Viet Nam War. His work is amazing and a...deeper dive into music". Furthermore, McCoy remarks "Dr. Brummer...combs record stores around the world looking for obscure and unique songs written about the war, and the collection he's continually building is some serious and important work".

James Barber's interview in military.com with "Justin Brummer, the one-man operation who put together the project...the greatest scholar of songs about the Vietnam War" notes "The Vietnam War Song Project is an epic undertaking". Barber also notes in his TechHive article "the amazing Vietnam War Song Project channel on YouTube... which aims to collect all songs written about the war. Many of these were one-off, private-pressing 45s, and Justin Brummer is painstakingly archiving them on YouTube". The University of Maryland's Modern Songs of War and Conflict archive comments "The Vietnam War Song Project, helmed by Justin Brummer" is "an ever-expanding project seeking to assemble a comprehensive discography of the war".

The Tennessee Council for the Social Studies has praised the work of the VWSP, noting the "Vietnam War Songs Project continues to find incredible Primary Sources for teachers to use in their Vietnam War teaching", and that the project "adds a different primary source emphasis to dealing with the Vietnam War". Rachel Lee Rubin, Professor of American Studies at the University of Massachusetts Boston, notes in her book Merle Haggard’s Okie from Muskogee, "I...want to call attention—to the magnificent Vietnam on Record discography, compiled by Hugo Keesing, Wouter Keesing, C. L. Yarbrough, and Justin Brummer". Writer Cori Brosnahan, in her PBS American Experience article on the songs of the My Lai massacre observes "researcher Justin Brummer started studying songs of the Vietnam War while preparing his PhD...and today he has catalogued some 5,000 songs".

See also
 List of anti-war songs
 List of songs about the Vietnam War

References

Music archives in the United States
Sound archives in the United States
Online archives
Songs of the Vietnam War
Recorded music
Discographies
2007 establishments in Texas